Kalikavu is a town in Nilambur taluk of Malappuram district in Kerala state, South India. Like the neighbouring town of Nilambur, Kalikavu is also known for rubber plantation. Coconut, pepper, arecanut, and teak are also cultivated here.

The nearest airport is Calicut International Airport (54 km) and the nearest railway station is Vaniyambalam Railway Station. Regular bus services operate between Kalikavu and cities such as Manjeri, Perinthalmanna, Thrissur and Kozhikode.

Suburbs and Villages
 Thandukode, Venthodanpadi, cherooth Puttamanna, Kurupoyil, and Amappoyil
 Vellayoor, Anchachavadi, Pallissery, Pariyangadu and Ambalakkadavu
 ( Ambalakkadvu, Karutheni, Poongode and Adakkakundu
 Chazhiyodu, Maruthungal, Moochikkal and 
 Chengodu Bridge and Enadi.

Culture
Kalikavu village is combined of Muslims, Hindu and Christian. Each religion respect another's traditions . This village is truly a great fans of football.

Transportation

Kalikavu village connects to other parts of India through Nilambur town.  State Highway No.28 starts from Nilambur and connects to Ooty, Mysore and Bangalore through Highways.12,29 and 181. National highway No.66 passes through Ramanattukara and the northern stretch connects to Goa and Mumbai.  The southern stretch connects to Cochin and Trivandrum. State.  The nearest airport is at Kozhikode.  The nearest major railway station is at Vaniyambalam.

FOR BUS TIME:

https://sites.google.com/site/hfponlinemedia/kalikavu-bus-time

References

External links

 http://kalikavupravasi.com/

Cities and towns in Malappuram district
Nilambur area